Santa Claus vs. Cupid is a 1915 silent American Christmas film.

Storyline 
Two men in Santa Claus suits are rivals for the love of the same woman. At the same time a desperate man becomes a thief at a Christmas party.

Cast 
Raymond McKee - Dick Norwood
Billy Casey - Edward Beck
Guido Colucci  - Binks Mulligan
Edith Wright - Mrs. Mulligan
Mabel Dwight - Mrs. Norwood
Gladys Gane - Rachel Beck
Florence Stover - Mrs. Beck
Grace Morrissey - Helen Bower
Margery Bonney Erskine	- Mrs. Bower

See also
 List of Christmas films

External links 
 

1915 films
American Christmas drama films
1910s Christmas drama films
1915 short films
American silent short films
American black-and-white films
Santa Claus in film
1915 drama films
1910s American films
Silent American drama films